William "Dolly" Gray was an American baseball center fielder and first baseman in the Negro leagues. He played from 1920 to 1937, spending time with several clubs.

References

External links
 and Baseball-Reference Black Baseball stats and Seamheads

Dayton Marcos players
Pittsburgh Keystones players
Cleveland Tate Stars players
Homestead Grays players
Lincoln Giants players
Newark Browns players
Brooklyn Royal Giants players
Year of birth missing
Year of death missing
Baseball outfielders